Edan Lui Cheuk-on (born 21 January 1997), is a Hong Kong singer, actor, presenter, and a member of the Hong Kong boy group MIRROR. Apart from his group activities, Edan made his solo debut in 2021 and has presented various television variety shows and starred in television dramas, most notably Ossan's Love (2021).

Life and career

Background and debut 
Edan was born in Hong Kong on 21 January 1997. He attended Salesian Yip Hon Millennium Primary School in Kwai Chung and the acclaimed Ho Fung College. Edan achieved high scores in the HKDSE. While studying business administration at the University of Hong Kong in 2018, Edan auditioned for ViuTV's reality talent competition Good Night Show - King Maker playing piano and singing Tanya Chua's "Blank Space", which put him through to the Top 50. Prior to competition, Edan was already a holder of Grade 8 certificates in both piano and violin, and is known to have perfect pitch. Edan finished the competition in eighth place, earning him a spot in the twelve-member boy group MIRROR. The group debuted on 3 November 2018 with the single "In a Second" .

Music 
In January 2021, Edan was the sixth MIRROR member to have his solo debut. His first single, "Mr. E's Series of Unfortunate Events" topped the 903 Top 20, Metro Radio Madden Song Chart and Chill Club charts. It also topped JOOX Hong Kong's Best-Selling Song Chart of Mid-2021. Later that year, he also released singles "Little Comedian" and "My Apple Pie" as a solo artist, as well as "Talents" / "A Promising Young Man" as a pair of duets with Taiwanese singer Kenny Khoo (Qiu Fengze). Edan's musical pursuits in 2021 gained him the Newcomer Award at the 2021 Metro Radio Hit Awards, the Silver Newcomer Award at the 2021 Ultimate Song Chart Awards, and the Silver Newcomer Award at the 2021/2022 Chill Club Chart Awards. 

On 1 April 2022, Edan released his first dance single, "Elevator". The song is also the first of Edan's solo singles to feature him rapping.

In June 2022, Edan sang a duet with Leo Ku as part of Ku's special album, IRLTS (I Really Love To Sing) which revisits his old songs and re-releases them as collaborations. Edan features on the first single, Floating Classroom, which was originally released in 2004.

Edan's fifth single, "LOVERSE", was released at midnight on New Year's Day of 2023.

Television 
Edan made his acting debut on the sitcom Showman's Show (2019), playing a religious young man who dreams of debuting in a boy band. He played a major supporting role with other MIRROR members as one of the team members in the volleyball drama We are the Littles (2020), and earned critical acclaim starring as Tin Yat-hung in the romantic comedy drama Ossan's Love (2021), a remake of the original Japanese television drama. In July 2022, Edan played Marven Lee, one of the lead roles in iSWIM, which is a ten-episode miniseries directed by Fung Chih-Chiang. Later this year, he also played Tak in the basketball drama We Got Game alongside fellow MIRROR members Stanley Yau and Keung To.

Film 
In June 2021, it was announced that Edan would soon make his big screen debut in Lunar New Year comedy Chilli Laugh Story (2022), co-starring Sandra Ng, Gigi Leung, and Ronald Cheng. Edan plays the role of Coba, who is based on the film's director and screenwriter, Coba Cheng. Edan also sings the original soundtrack "When Life Gives You Chillies" with Sandra Ng and Gigi Leung. The film's premiere was originally scheduled for February of 2022, but was postponed until 14 July 2022 due to cinemas across Hong Kong being closed as a result of COVID pandemic restrictions. The film surpassed HK$10 million at the Hong Kong box office within four days. 

Premiering in November 2022, Edan also played a main role, Yeung, in Hong Kong Family which also stars Teresa Mo. Hong Kong Family marks Edan's first major role in the dramatic genre. He also sings the original soundtrack, No Matter How Far, for the film. 

In 2023, Edan is also set to feature in Over My Dead Body, a horror comedy in which Edan will once again work with Ronald Cheng, and also features fellow MIRROR member Jer Lau in a supporting role.  

In September, Sandra Ng, the producer of Chilli Laugh Story, announced that the film would have a sequel featuring the original cast, this time centering around the theme of mahjong. The film is scheduled to be released around the Lunar New Year period of 2023.

Voice acting 
In 2021, Edan took on the role of the Cantonese voice of Finny, a young Nestrian, in Ooops! The Adventure Continues alongside Shirley Chan, who voices Leia. 

Edan will also voice Hank, a beagle dog who aspires to be a samurai, in the Cantonese dubbed version of Paws of Fury: The Legend of Hank. He will once again work with Shirley Chan, as well as fellow MIRROR member Stanley Yau. The film airs in Hong Kong cinemas starting January 19, 2023.

Variety shows 
Edan told his manager early during his debut with MIRROR that he wanted to pursue work in variety shows. Despite appearing shy and reserved, Edan displayed his comedic side on MIRROR GO, which saw Edan and his bandmates travel to different countries to take on absurd and dangerous challenges. Following two seasons of MIRROR GO, Edan has also hosted a number of variety shows on ViuTV, including Taiwan Meimei (2019), which he hosted alongside Cantonese opera veteran Law Kar-ying, and the game show Battle Feel. His most notable work as a host is for the game show Be ON Game, which has run for two seasons to date, with a third season currently being filmed.

Discography

Singles

As lead artist

Collaborations

Soundtrack appearances

Filmography

Television series

Variety shows

Film

MV Appearance (Actor)

Awards and nominations

Music Award

Film Award

References

External links
 
 
 

1997 births
Living people
Hong Kong male film actors
Hong Kong male television actors
Hong Kong television personalities
21st-century Hong Kong male singers
Cantopop singer-songwriters
Hong Kong idols
King Maker contestants
Mirror (group) members
Hong Kong male  singer-songwriters
Hong Kong male comedians
Alumni of the University of Hong Kong